Sultan Muhammad Qutb Shah (also transliterated in different ways) was the sixth ruler of the kingdom of Golconda in southern India under the Qutb Shahi dynasty.

He ruled from 1612 to 1625. He was the nephew and son-in-law of Muhammad Quli Qutb Shah, having married Muhammad's only daughter Hayat Bakshi Begum in 1607.

The first Qutb Shahi history was compiled during his reign known as the Tarikh-i Qutb Shahi. His son, Abdullah Qutub Shah, later became the Shah of Golconda.

The Aga Khan Trust for Culture is carrying out the conservation effort on the sprawling necropolis in collaboration with Department of Archaeology and Museums, Telangana.

References

   
   

Qutb Shahi dynasty